Neuf-Brisach is a French former canton in the arrondissement of Colmar in the département Haut-Rhin, Alsace. It had 17,149 inhabitants (2012). It was disbanded following the French canton reorganisation which came into effect in March 2015. It consisted of 16 communes, which joined the canton of Ensisheim in 2015.

The canton comprised the following communes:

 Algolsheim
 Appenwihr
 Balgau
 Biesheim
 Dessenheim
 Geiswasser
 Heiteren
 Hettenschlag
 Logelheim
 Nambsheim
 Neuf-Brisach (seat)
 Obersaasheim
 Vogelgrun
 Volgelsheim
 Weckolsheim
 Wolfgantzen

References

Neuf-Brisach
2015 disestablishments in France
States and territories disestablished in 2015